Evert Constantijn Hingst (22 March 1969 – 31 October 2005) was a Dutch lawyer. He was murdered in Amsterdam, one day before he would talk to various media about the various investigations the Dutch Department of Justice was conducting after him.

Among Hingst's clients were many noted criminals, including Sam Klepper and John Mieremet, who was once shot in front of Hingst's office. After this assault, Mieremet has claimed that Hingst had tried to set him up and promised revenge. Mieremet was murdered several days later, on 2 November, in Thailand. Both he and Hingst were suspected of involvement in the extortion and subsequent murder of real estate magnate Willem Endstra.

Born in Utrecht, Hingst was imprisoned for several weeks when, during a raid of his office in 2005, the police discovered three firearms and a large sum of cash. A suspect of money laundering, membership of a criminal organization and possession of firearms, Hingst gave up his profession as a lawyer in July, 2005. Hingst had previously been arrested on charges of forgery of documents in 2004.

External links
 Nu.nl coverage of Hingst's murder (Dutch)
 Nu.nl coverage of Mieremet's murder (Dutch)

1969 births
2005 deaths
20th-century Dutch lawyers
Dutch murder victims
Deaths by firearm in the Netherlands
People from Utrecht (city)
People murdered in the Netherlands
People murdered by Dutch organized crime
21st-century Dutch lawyers